Rushville Commercial Historic District is a national historic district located at Rushville, Rush County, Indiana.  The district encompasses 54 contributing buildings in the central business district of Rushville.  The district developed between about 1847 and 1940 and includes notable examples of Greek Revival, Italianate, Romanesque Revival, Classical Revival, Collegiate Gothic, Commercial style, and Art Deco style architecture.  Located in the district are the separately listed Durbin Hotel, Melodeon Hall, and Rush County Courthouse.  Other notable buildings include the former Methodist Episcopal Church (1847-1850), Church of Christ / Boys' and Girls' Club (1850-1853), Beher-King Block (1883), Presbyterian Church (1892-1893), Rushville National Bank (1911), Phoenix Lodge (1913–1915), Rushville Public Library (c. 1930), and former Castle Theatre (1939).

It was listed on the National Register of Historic Places in 1993.

References

Historic districts on the National Register of Historic Places in Indiana
Greek Revival architecture in Indiana
Romanesque Revival architecture in Indiana
Italianate architecture in Indiana
Neoclassical architecture in Indiana
Art Deco architecture in Indiana
Historic districts in Rush County, Indiana
National Register of Historic Places in Rush County, Indiana